Amber: Journeys Beyond is an American computer game released in 1996 for Apple Macintosh computers and Windows 95. It is the only game produced by Hue Forest Entertainment, founded by Frank and Susan Wimmer.

Gameplay 
Amber: Journeys Beyond is a first-person point-and-click adventure game similar to Myst. Gameplay is nonlinear and events in the game occur at random depending on the player's progress.

Plot 
Note: As the game is nonlinear, events described below may not necessarily occur in that order when playing the game.

The player character's friend Dr. Roxanne ("Roxy") Westbridge purchases a reportedly haunted house in North Carolina and begins to perform paranormal tests there. A mutual friend asks the player character to check on her, as he is worried that she may be too hasty with the still undeveloped ghost hunting equipment. The player character drives to the house. Suddenly, in the middle of the road an apparition appears. The player character swerves to the right to avoid the ghostly shape and ends up in the nearby pond. The player character emerges soaking wet and explores the garage and house. Roxy appears to be unconscious in the garage with a device on her head, and the house has no electricity.

After restoring electricity, the player character discovers that Roxy has several types of ghost-hunting equipment: surveillance cameras; the BAR (Bulbic Activity Reader); a doorknob sensor which detects spiritual residue in doorknobs; the PeeK, a pocket television-like device which allows the user to listen to the sounds in the doorknobs and works with the BAR and cameras to observe spiritual activity from a safe distance; and the AMBER (Astral Mobility By Electromagnetic Resonance) headset device itself, which allows the user to enter the minds of ghosts to discover what they are thinking and seeing and to remind them of who they are so they may ascend. The last device is still in the testing phase and its use is considered to be very risky. Apparently Roxy's spirit was lost while she was attempting to use the AMBER device.

Through the combined use of the devices, the player character discover that there are three resident ghosts in and around the house.

Brice, a gardener who believed that UFOs would come to take him away, became obsessed with his employer's daughter, Mandy, who disliked him and didn't share his interests. When he believed that they were finally coming, he banged on the backdoor to the house and called Mandy, who answered. Mandy did not respond positively, so he killed her and placed the body in a hidden compartment under the gazebo he had built. Subsequently, he killed her parents and committed suicide after he realized what he had done. After the player character assists his spirit, Brice is received by the aliens; however, rather than being sent to paradise, he is sent to another unpleasant place.

Another ghost is Margaret, who committed suicide after her husband died overseas fighting in World War II. After the player character assists her spirit, she joins her husband's spirit in the afterlife.

The final ghost is Edwin, a child who was sledding when he ended up on the frozen pond. The ice broke and he was trapped beneath it and drowned. The player character reunites him with his teddy bear and clown doll in Edwin's underwater castle.

After the three ghosts are freed, the player character helps Roxy by doing some programming with her computer, which tells the player character to place the AMBER on her head then leave the area quickly. The player character stands a safe distance from the garage, which explodes. Roxy emerges from the flames seemingly unscathed and unaware of all the events that took place. She thanks the player character and explains the algorithms for AMBER probably need tweaking (hence the explosion); she asks if everything is all right in the house. Roxy excitedly explains the results of these tests of AMBER should be sent to the lab very soon. In the final moments of the game, Roxy asks, "Where'd you park your car?"

Cast 
 Emily Andress as Margaret
 Susan Wimmer as the voice of Margaret
 Lauren Andress as the voice of Edwin
 Matt Andress as Edwin
 Michael Brocki as Brice
 Sandi Fix as Roxy
 Greg Purdy as the voice of Chippy
 Tommi Swinson as Mandy
 Brendan Underhill as Richard

Reception 

At the time of release, the game received moderate to favorable reviews from critics. Most commented that while Amber fell in with the pile of Myst clones coming out at the time, its eerie storyline and presentation to an extent offset its limited gameplay and animation and made it stand out from the rest of the pack. A Next Generation critic was bothered more than most by the similarities to Myst, but concluded that "If you overlook the lack of originality in the game's mechanics, you might just enjoy the ride for what it's worth - a scary story told with nice graphics and some boggling puzzles." Particular subjects of praise included the haunting textured environments and ambient soundtrack.

However, Robert Coffey of Computer Gaming World and Rebecca Anderson of GameSpot both also criticized that the game is too short and the final puzzle is anticlimactic, though Anderson remarked that most of the puzzles are genuinely challenging and well-integrated with the story. PC Gamess Shane Mooney summarized, "None too original, but it could have been worse. Journeys Beyond is a little better than most Myst-like adventure games." Newsweek gave a positive review in their November 1996 issue. while Chuck Klimushyn of Computer Games Strategy Plus called Amber "an unassuming masterpiece".

The editors of Macworld gave Amber their 1996 "Best Adventure Game" award. Steven Levy of the magazine wrote, "Strip Myst of its fantasy-genre trappings and replace them with a dollop of Stephen King, and you can begin to understand what it feels like to play Amber: Journeys Beyond—a gorgeous, absorbing supernatural adventure." He concluded, "At its best, Amber fulfills some of the almost-never-realized ambitions of interactive fiction."

In 2011, Adventure Gamers named Amber the 70th-best adventure game ever released.

Awards 
 Software Publishers Association: Excellence In Software Codie award Finalist—Best Debut of the Year
 Macworld, January 1997: Game Hall of Fame—Best Adventure Game of the Year
 HIDE (Human Interface Design Excellence) Award Finalist—Third Place, for Most Elegant Interface
 Computer Games Strategy Plus February 1997: Stamp of Approval
 MACup Magazine, February 1997: Game of the Month

Sales
The Macintosh version of Amber: Journeys Beyond had disappointing sales. Jeanine DeSocio, president of publisher Changeling, attributed this to retailer reluctance to stock any Macintosh games that are not ports of high-profile PC games.

References 

 AMBER: Journeys Beyond instruction booklet
 AMBER: Journeys Beyond
 
 Hue Forest Entertainment archived website at Internet Archive

External links 

 
 
  Amber Installer for Windows XP

1996 video games
Adventure games
Point-and-click adventure games
First-person adventure games
Video games about ghosts
Classic Mac OS games
Video games developed in the United States
Video games set in North Carolina
Windows games
Single-player video games
Apple Design Awards recipients